Cisalpina may refer to:
 Gallia Cisalpina, the Italian name of Cisalpine Gaul, an ancient place name in the modern Italy
 Repubblica Cisalpina, the Italian name of the Cisalpine Republic, an ancient place name in the modern Italy
 Cisalpina Private Natural Heritage Reserve, a private natural heritage reserve in Brazil

See also
 Cisalpine (disambiguation)
 Cernuella cisalpina, a species of snail
 ICQ Banca Cisalpina, a predecessor of FinecoBank